Crizbav is a commune in Brașov County, Transylvania, Romania. It is composed of two villages, Crizbav and Cutuș (Kutastelep).

At the 2011 census, 83.1% of inhabitants were Romanians and 16.1% Hungarians.

Geographical setting
It lies on the banks of the Crizbav River, on a high plateau of the Burzenland depression, at the southern foot of the Perșani Mountains.

Crizbav borders:
to the north – the communes Comăna and Măieruș;
to the east – the commune Feldioara;
to the south – the commune Hălchiu;
to the west – the communes Dumbrăvița and Părău.

Short history
The first written documents of the material and spiritual life of the commune dates back to Roman times. Evidence is provided by the Crizbav Citadel, which experts consider that it was built by the Romans after the occupation of Dacia, but certain written attestations are from 1335.

The history of the village is rich, beginning with the German name of the city, (Krebs Bach = Crabs Valley) and continuing with the use of Crizbav Citadel as military observation tower, as confirmed by the "Diploma of King Louis the Great" of March 12, 1344, or that of Prince Stephen Báthory of October 30, 1484.

Landmarks
Archaeological site "La Cetate" (Crizbav) code LMI 2004 ISA-11273-BV formed by:
medieval fortification, LMI 2004 Code: BV-ImA-11273.01
Hallstatt settlement, LMI 2004 Code: BV-ImA-11273.02
Dacian fortress, LMI 2004 Code: BV-ImA-11273.03
Heldenburg Citadel code LMI 2004: BV-II-I A-11662

References

 

Communes in Brașov County
Localities in Transylvania
Burzenland